Vladyslav Tereshchenko, (born March 25, 1972) is a Ukrainian sprint canoer who competed from the mid-1990s to the early 2000s (decade). He was eliminated in the semifinals of both the K-1 500 m and the K-1 1000 m events at the 1996 Summer Olympics in Atlanta. Four years later in Sydney, Tereshchenko was eliminated in the semifinals of the K-1 1000 m event.

References
Sports-Reference.com profile

Olympic canoeists of Ukraine
Ukrainian male canoeists
1972 births
Living people
Canoeists at the 1996 Summer Olympics
Canoeists at the 2000 Summer Olympics
Vladyslav
21st-century Ukrainian people